Home Stretch is the third novel written by the author, presenter and comedian Graham Norton.

Plot 
In a small village in Ireland in 1987, a car crash occurs which kills three of the six passengers while paralysing another. The novel then follows one of the survivors, Connor, from 1987 to 2019 as well as his wider family through various locations including London, Liverpool, and New York.

Promotion 
The book was promoted on Sara Cox's BBC talk show Between The Covers.

References 

2020 British novels
Hodder & Stoughton books
Family saga novels